Leonard A. Wilf (born 1947) is an American businessman, the president of Garden Homes, the co-owner and vice chairman of the Minnesota Vikings football team, and co-owner of the Nashville SC.

Early life
Leonard Wilf was born in Göggingen, Germany, the son of Holocaust survivors Harry Wilf and Judith Wilf (died 2006). From the age of nine, he grew up in New Jersey. Wilf earned a B.A. degree from Boston University, a J.D. degree from Georgetown University, and an LL.M. degree in taxation from New York University.

Wilf grew up in Hillside, New Jersey in a home adjoining that of his cousin Zygi.

Career
Wilf is president of the family-owned real estate development company, Garden Homes.

With his cousins, brothers Zygi and Mark Wilf, he co-owns the Minnesota Vikings football team. In August 2017, Wilf and his cousins became co-owners of the Nashville SC alongside lead investor John Ingram. In 2015, the Wilf family had an estimated net worth of $5 billion.

Philanthropy
Wilf has sat on the Board of Trustees of NewYork–Presbyterian Hospital since 2009.  Wilf is chairman of the American Society for Yad Vashem, and has been on the United States Holocaust Memorial Museum Council.

Personal life
Wilf was married to the educator and philanthropist Dr. Marcia Robbins-Wilf. She is the daughter of Saul Robbins, the co-founder of the Remco toy company, and his wife Ruth. Their divorce negotiations took 12 years, with $20 million in fees for lawyers and accountants. According to Wilf, "I was divorced, married and had a baby all in one week."

Wilf and his wife Beth have four children and live in New York City. He is a member of Mountain Ridge Country Club in West Caldwell, and a keen golfer.

References

1947 births
Living people
Leonard
American lawyers
American real estate businesspeople
Minnesota Vikings owners
American people of Polish-Jewish descent
New York University School of Law alumni
Boston University alumni
Georgetown University Law Center alumni
American billionaires
People from Hillside, New Jersey
Nashville SC